A referendum on joining the European Union was held in the Czech Republic on 13 and 14 June 2003. The proposal was supported by 77.3% of voters, with a turnout of 55.2%. The Czech Republic joined the EU on 1 May 2004.

Campaign
Opinion polls in the run-up to the referendum showed support for joining from 63% to over 70%, with the highest support among younger, wealthier and better educated people.

Party policies
The table lists the political parties which were represented in the parliament at the time of the referendum.

Opinion polls

Results

See also
Czech Republic and the euro

References

Czech
Referendums in the Czech Republic
Referendums related to European Union accession
European Union membership referendum
Czech European Union membership referendum
Czech
Czech Republic and the European Union
Czech